Cheney State Park is a state park of Kansas in the United States. Completed in 1964, the park is located in Kingman and Reno counties in Kansas, 5 miles north of Cheney and 20 miles west of Wichita.

The park is divided into two areas  comprising , straddling the  Cheney Reservoir, one of the top sailing lakes in the United States. The Ninnescah Sailing Association has facilities in the West Shore Area. A marina in the East Shore Area offers supplies and services for boaters and anglers.

There are nature and hiking trails at Giefer Creek and Spring Creek. A handicapped-accessible fishing complex is available at the Toadstool Loop Jetty.

The park features 29 miles of asphalt roads and parking areas; a park office; 2 marinas; 223 electrical hookup sites with water; over 400 primitive camp sites; 4 trailer dumpstations; 6 boat ramps with 22 launching lanes; 4 courtesy docks; 2 fish cleaning stations; 7 modern pit toilets; 9 showerhouses; 1 shelter with restrooms; 2 large group shelters; 2 medium group shelters; 29 small picnic shelters; 1 group camping area with 20 utility sites, a large shelter and a restroom; 2 nature trails; and 7 modern cabins.

The  Cheney Wildlife Area adjacent to the park provides opportunities for wildlife watching, nature photography, and hunting. A refuge has been set aside within the wildlife area for migratory waterfowl. The area is closed to all activities from September 15 through March 15, when it is reopened for fishing and non-hunting day use activities.

See also
 List of Kansas state parks
 List of lakes, reservoirs, and dams in Kansas
 List of rivers of Kansas

References

External links 

Cheney State Park Kansas Department of Wildlife, Parks and Tourism
Ninnescah Sailing Association

State parks of Kansas
Protected areas of Kingman County, Kansas
Protected areas of Reno County, Kansas
Protected areas established in 1964
1964 establishments in Kansas